Ghoghara is a village of Sarai tehsil in Singrauli district of Madhya Pradesh.

References 

Singrauli
Villages in Singrauli district